Two ships of the United States Navy have borne the name USS Manchester, named in honor of the city of Manchester, New Hampshire.

  was a  light cruiser, launched in 1946 and struck in 1960

United States Navy ship names